Sir Edward Giles (1566–1637) of Bowden House, Ashprington, near Totnes, Devon, was an English politician who sat in the House of Commons at various times between 1597 and 1629.

Origins
Giles was the son John Giles of Bowden, Member of Parliament for Totnes, and was baptised at Totnes on 21 July 1566.  Edward's great-grandfather, John Giles, was also MP for Totnes.  His Great-Grandfather was one of the richest merchants in Devon and  owned properties in and around Totnes, Dean Prior, Bowden and Ashprington.

Career
He matriculated at Exeter College, Oxford on 1 February 1583, aged 17. He was a student of the Middle Temple in 1584. In 1597 he was elected Member of Parliament for Totnes. He was knighted on 23 July 1603 and appointed High Sheriff of Devon for 1612–13. In 1614 he was elected MP for Devon. He was elected MP for Totnes again in 1621 and was re-elected in 1624 and 1625. In 1628 he was elected MP for Totnes again and sat until 1629 when King Charles I decided to rule without Parliament for eleven years.

Marriage and children
On 28 January 1587 at Newton St Cyres, near Crediton, Devon, Giles married Mary Drewe daughter and heiress of Edmond Drewe of Hayne, Newton St Cyres, Devon, and widow of Walter Northcote (1566–1587), younger brother of John Northcote (1570–1632) of Uton and Hayne, Newton St Cyres, the latter who was ancestor of the Northcote Baronets and the Earls of Iddesleigh.  By his wife he had one son, Adam (born 21 March 1595 in Newton Toney, Wiltshire), and one daughter, neither of whom survived him.

Death and burial
Giles died at the age of 71 and was buried in St George's Church, Dean Prior, where survives his monument erected in 1642.

References

 

1566 births
1637 deaths
Alumni of Exeter College, Oxford
Members of the Middle Temple
Members of the Parliament of England (pre-1707) for Totnes
English MPs 1597–1598
English MPs 1614
English MPs 1621–1622
English MPs 1624–1625
English MPs 1625
English MPs 1628–1629
High Sheriffs of Devon
Members of the Parliament of England (pre-1707) for Devon